Leptaspis is a genus of Paleotropical plants in the grass family, native to Africa, southern Asia, northern Australia, and a few islands of the western Pacific.

 Species
 Leptaspis angustifolia Summerh. & C.E.Hubb. - New Guinea, Fiji
 Leptaspis banksii R.Br. - Queensland, New Caledonia, New Guinea, Solomon Islands, Philippines, Taiwan, Sulawesi, Malaysia, Java, Lesser Sunda Islands, Thailand
 Leptaspis zeylanica Nees ex Steud. - tropical Africa from Liberia to Ethiopia to Zimbabwe; Madagascar, Comoros, Sri Lanka, Java, Malaysia, Sumatra, Sulawesi, New Guinea, Solomon Islands

 Formerly included
see Scrotochloa 
 Leptaspis manillensis - Scrotochloa urceolata 
 Leptaspis tararaensis - Scrotochloa tararaensis  
 Leptaspis urceolata - Scrotochloa urceolata

References

Poaceae
Poaceae genera